Final tables of the 2006 Latvian Higher League Championship.

League standings

Match table

Relegation play-offs
The matches were played on 9 and 12 November 2006.

|}

Top scorers

Awards

References

Latvian Higher League seasons
1
Latvia
Latvia